The Service in B-flat major (in full Morning, Evening and Communion Service in B-flat), Op. 10, is a collection of Anglican church music by Charles Villiers Stanford for mixed choir and organ containing the canticles for each of the principal services of the Anglican Church. Stanford set the traditional liturgical texts in English in 1879 when he was the organist of Trinity College, Cambridge. They were published by Novello in 1902. Stanford orchestrated the work in 1903, with additional organ.

History 
In 1877, Charles Villiers Stanford, returning from extended studies in Leipzig and Berlin, was appointed organist of Trinity College, Cambridge. He had to conduct two weekly rehearsals, training the boys for six hours per week during term time, and four hours during vacation. Choral services were held on Saturdays and Sundays, also on Christmas Eve, on Christmas Day, on the Feast of the Circumcision (1 January) and Epiphany (6 January).

Stanford composed the service in B major, as the first of several, for mixed choir and organ in 1879. He set the traditional liturgical Anglican texts in English, as part of his efforts to improve singing at the College Chapel. The Jubilate Deo (Psalm 100) and Te Deum in B were first performed during Matins (Morning service) on 25 May 1879. On 24 August that year, during vacation, the Te Deum was repeated with the first performance of the Benedictus, while the Magnificat and the Nunc dimittis  were first performed in the evening service. The Service in B was a significant development in Stanford's setting of the morning and evening canticles.

Structure and music 
The work is structured in the ten traditional sections of the Anglican service:
 Morning Service
 Te Deum
 Jubilate
 Benedictus
 Communion Service
 Kyrie (10-fold)
 Credo
 Sursum corda
 Sanctus
 Gloria in excelsis
 Evening Service
 Magnificat
 Nunc dimittis

A reviewer summarised: "The service is a major milestone in the development of Anglican church music, representing the harnessing of Brahmsian symphonic technique to the needs of the Anglican liturgy."

Recordings 
A 2010 recording The Feast of Saint Peter the Apostle at Westminster Abbey, celebrating the patron saint of Westminster Abbey, contains four of the ten parts, performed by the Choir of Westminster Abbey and organist Robert Quinney, conducted by James O'Donnell.

References

External links 
 
 Jubilate in B-flat churchmusicinstitute.org

Compositions by Charles Villiers Stanford
Choral compositions
1879 compositions
Psalm settings